The 3rd Chess Olympiad, organized by the FIDE and comprising an open and women's tournament, as well as several events designed to promote the game of chess, took place between July 13 and July 27, 1930, in Hamburg, Germany. The 2nd Women's World Chess Championship also took place during the Olympiad.

Results

Team standings

{| class="wikitable"
! # !!Country !! Players !! Points
|-
| style="background:gold;"|1 ||  || Rubinstein, Tartakower, Przepiórka, Makarczyk, Frydman || 48½ 
|-
| style="background:silver;"|2 ||  Hungary || Maróczy, Takács, Vajda, Havasi, Steiner E. || 47
|-
|  style="background:#cc9966;"|3 ||  || Ahues, Sämisch, Carls, Richter, Wagner || 44½
|-
| 4 ||  || Kmoch, Müller, Eliskases, Lokvenc, Wolf || 43½
|-
| 5 ||  || Flohr, Treybal K., Rejfíř, Prokeš, Pokorný || 42½
|-
| 6 ||   || Kashdan, Marshall, Phillips, Steiner H., Anderson || 41½
|-
| 7 ||  || Weenink, Van den Bosch, Noteboom, Landau, Schelfhout || 41
|-
| 8 ||  || Sultan Khan, Yates, Thomas, Winter, Tylor || 40½
|-
| 9 ||  || Ståhlberg, Berndtsson, Stoltz, Lundin, Jacobson  || 40
|-
| 10 ||  || Apšenieks, Petrovs, Feigins, Taube || 35
|-
| 11 ||  || Andersen, Ruben, Desler, Olsen, Gemzøe || 31
|-
| 12 ||  || Alekhine, Betbeder, Gromer, Duchamp, Voisin || 28½
|-
| 13 ||  || Baratz, Balogh, Tyroler, Taubmann, Gudju || 28½
|-
| 14 ||  || Machtas, Šeinbergas, Vistaneckis, Abramavičius, Kolodnas || 22½
|-
| 15 ||  || Gilfer, Ásgeirsson, Thorvaldsson, Guðmundsson || 22
|-
| 16 ||  || Marín y Llovet, Golmayo Torriente, Lafora, Ribera, Soler || 21½
|-
| 17 ||  || Rasmusson, Krogius, Larsen, Gauffin, Rahm || 18
|-
| 18 ||  || Olsen, Hovind, Kavlie-Jørgensen, Krogdahl, Halvorsen || 16
|}

Team results

Individual medals

The individual ratings were solely based on number of points scored. No board order was applied and only top three individual results were awarded with a prize.
 Gold medal won Akiba Rubinstein (Poland), scoring 15/17 (88.2%);
 Silver medal won Salo Flohr (Czechoslovakia), scoring 14.5/17 (85.3%);
Bronze medal won Isaac Kashdan (USA), scoring 14/17 (82.4%).

References

3rd Chess Olympiad: Hamburg 1930 OlimpBase

03
Olympiad 03
Chess Olympiad 03
Olympiad 03
Chess Olympiad 03
1930s in Hamburg
July 1930 sports events